Melbourne Hakoah is a defunct Australian sports club which had a predominantly Jewish Australian supporter base, akin to Hakoah Vienna. The club's best known arm was its soccer club.

History
The club was founded in 1927, and within a decade was one of the leading sides in the Victorian First Division. The club broke ground by becoming the first successful non-Anglo migrant backed club in the state, laying the foundation for the dominance of other migrant run clubs after World War II. While the club was unable to win a league title post-war, it still managed several victories in the Dockerty Cup, including four consecutive titles in the 1950s. Gradually, the club's supporter base dwindled due to assimilation and lack of renewal from younger supporters, and it eventually merged with South Melbourne's Victorian league reserve side in the early 1980s.

Honours
 Victorian Premier League titles: 4
1934, 1935, 1938, 1943
 Dockerty Cup titles: 8
1935, 1945, 1953, 1954, 1955, 1956, 1966, 1973

External links
Official
 Melbourne Hakoah Official Site

Association football clubs established in 1927
Association football clubs disestablished in 1983
Hakoah sport clubs
Jewish football clubs
H
Defunct soccer clubs in Australia
Jews and Judaism in Melbourne
1927 establishments in Australia
1983 disestablishments in Australia